The Places Between: The Best of Doves is a compilation album from Manchester-based indie rock band Doves. The compilation was released on 5 April 2010 in the UK via Heavenly Recordings, and on 20 April 2010 in North America via Astralwerks. The album encompasses the band's entire career, collecting from their 2000 debut album Lost Souls, 2002's The Last Broadcast, 2005's Some Cities, and their 2009 album Kingdom of Rust, as well as an assortment of EPs and singles. The compilation was released as a standard single-disc best-of, as well as a deluxe three-disc edition, featuring the best-of album along with a bonus disc of B-sides, rarities, alternate versions, and album cuts, plus a bonus DVD collecting all of the band's music videos from 1998 through 2009. It peaked at #12 on the UK Albums Chart.

The best-of was preceded by the single "Andalucia", released to radio stations on 1 March 2010, then as a digital download-only single on 5 April 2010.

Conception
In an interview with Spinner.com, Jimi Goodwin stated that the band was "very involved" in selecting tracks to comprise the track listings, stating that, "Hopefully, it stands up to things like Songs to Learn & Sing by Echo & the Bunnymen, because I look at those as albums in their own right; you forget that they're compilations." Jez Williams stated in an interview with musicOMH that track selection was refreshing: "When you finish an album quite often you get out of the studio and just want to get away from it. I thought that it was interesting listening to this, because normally when we finish an album you wouldn't hear it again. It was great hearing the B-sides too. We feel we've written some pretty strong B-sides, but you get that thing where we're described as anthemic a lot, which is great, but I think the B-sides reveal a few other sides to us. It shows a lot more than what we're known for." Goodwin also told The Daily Record that the compilation is "wiping the slate clean – we have nothing else in the vaults now. That is it. Whatever we do from now on will be a new start."

The band's recording hiatus lasted for over ten years, until they released their fifth studio album The Universal Want in September 2020. In the interim, Goodwin released a solo album entitled Odludek in 2014, while Jez and Andy Williams regrouped as Black Rivers and released an eponymously titled album in 2015.

Critical reception

The Places Between was met with very positive reviews. PopMatters awarded the compilation an 8 out of 10 rating, noting that, "When it comes to the singles they've put out... the consistency has been remarkable, with not a dud in the lot, the band putting out some of the most finely crafted rock songs to come out of the UK of late." Clash awarded the album a 9 out of 10 and called the collection "a beguiling celebration of truly excellent music." IndieLondon gave the album 5 out of 5 stars, calling the album "a best-of collection to savour," and the BBC hailed The Places Between as "a collection of monumental music to truly cherish."

Track listing

Bonus disc track listing

DVD track listing

The DVD also features the videos for "There Goes the Fear", "Pounding" and "Caught by the River" in 5.1 Surround Sound.

Release history

Charts

Notes
Disc one:
 Tracks 4, 7, 10, and 15 taken from Lost Souls (April 2000)
 Original version of track 12 taken from Lost Souls; Summer Version taken from the single "The Man Who Told Everything" (October 2000)
 Tracks 1, 5, 8, and 14 taken from The Last Broadcast (April 2002)
 Track 2 taken from Some Cities (February 2005)
 Original version of track 3 taken from Some Cities; Rich Costey Mix taken from the single "Snowden" (May 2005)
 Tracks 6, 9, and 11 taken from Kingdom of Rust (April 2009)
 Track 13: previously unreleased

Disc two:
 Tracks 1, 6, 10, 11, 12, and 16: previously unreleased
 Track 2 and the original version of track 16 taken from the single "Black and White Town" (February 2005)
 Tracks 3 and 17 taken from Lost Souls (April 2000)
 Track 4 taken from the Sea EP (May 1999)
 Track 5 taken from the single "Kingdom of Rust" (March 2009)
 Track 7 taken from the single "Catch the Sun" (May 2000)
 Track 8 taken from the single "Pounding" (July 2002)
 Tracks 9 and 15 taken from The Last Broadcast (April 2002)
 Tracks 13 and 19 taken from the single "The Man Who Told Everything" (October 2000)
 Track 14 taken from the UK iTunes-only release of Kingdom of Rust (April 2009)
 Track 18 taken from Some Cities (February 2005)

Run time notes:
 A ^ Though not listed as an edit on the track listing, the full-length album version of "Sea Song" runs 6:12
 B ^ The full-length album version of "Rise" runs 5:38
 C ^ This version omits the ambient noise found at the end of the album version
 D ^ The full-length Noise Version of "Firesuite" runs 3:09

Credits
Musicians
All instruments by Doves, except:
 "There Goes the Fear"
 Percussion by Marc Starr, Chris Davies, Billy Booth, and Richard Sliwa.
 "Black and White Town", "Here It Comes", "10:03" and "Blue Water"
 Piano by Martin Rebelski.
 "Snowden"
 Glockenspiel by Ben Hillier.
 Backing vocals by Guy Garvey.
 Strings by Millennia Strings.
 String arrangements by Ian Burdge.
 "Words"
 Keyboards and glockenspiel by Martin Rebelski.
 Violin by Rosie Lowdell.
 Megaphone by Brian Madden.
 "Kingdom of Rust"
 Piano by Martin Rebelski.
 Violins by Belinda Hammond and Oliver Morris.
 Viola by Alexandra Fletcher.
 Cello by Elinor Gow.
 "The Man Who Told Everything"
 Strings by Kate Evans, Jane Coyle, Barbara Grunthal, and Wendy Edison.
 "Andalucia"
 Violin by Belinda Hammond.
 "Rise"
 Harmonica by Stuart Warburton.
 "Valley" and "Your Shadow Lay Across My Life"
 Keyboards by Martin Rebelski.
 "The Drifter"
 Backing vocals by Simon Aldred.
 "Almost Forgot Myself"
 Backing vocals by Guy Garvey.
 "At the Tower"
 Keyboards and percussion by Ben Hillier.
 "The Sulphur Man"
 Keyboards and glockenspiel by Martin Rebelski.
 Violins by Rosie Lowdell, Jackie Norrie, Sally Herbert, and Brian Wright.
 Viola by Brian Wright.
 Cello by Marcus Holdaway.
 Trombone by Andy Robinson and Marc Bassey.
 Trumpet and flugelhorn by Steve Waterman.
 Flute and tenor saxophone by Colin Crawley.
 Orchestral arrangement by Sean O'Hagan.

Production
 "There Goes the Fear", "Words", "Pounding", "M62 Song" and "The Sulphur Man" produced by Doves; additional production by Max Heyes. Mixed by Doves and Max Heyes.
 "Black and White Town", "Eleven Miles Out", "At the Tower", "Ambition" and "Sky Starts Falling" produced and mixed by Doves and Ben Hillier.
 "Snowden" produced by Doves and Ben Hillier. Mixed by Rich Costey.
 "Here It Comes", "Sea Song", "The Cedar Room", "Rise", "Darker", "Willow's Song", "Valley", "Northenden", "Almost Forgot Myself", "Reprise" and "Firesuite" produced and mixed by Doves.
 "Kingdom of Rust" and "Jetstream" produced by Doves and Dan Austin. Mixed by Michael H. Brauer.
 "10:03" produced by Doves and John Leckie. Mixed by Dan Austin.
 "Catch the Sun" and "Caught by the River" produced by Doves and Steve Osborne. Mixed by Steve Osborne.
 "The Man Who Told Everything" produced by Doves. Mixed by Doves and Steve Osborne.
 "Andalucia", "Blue Water" and "The Drifter" produced by Doves and Dan Austin. Mixed by Dave Bascombe.
 "Push Me On" produced by Doves and John Leckie. Mixed by John Leckie and Dan Austin.
 "Your Shadow Lay Across My Life" produced by Doves. Mixed by Doves and Adrian Bushby.
 "The Last Son" produced by Doves and Dan Austin. Mixed by Dan Austin.
 "Winter Hill" produced by Doves and John Leckie. Mixed by Dave Bascombe.
 Mastered by Miles Showell at Metropolis Mastering, except "Kingdom of Rust", "10:03" and "Jetstream" mastered by Bob Ludwig at Gateway Mastering. "Push Me On" mastered by Guy Davie at Electric Mastering.

Visual
 Art direction and design by Rick Myers (Myers | Art-Utility).
 Cover: firework photography by Pierre Le Hors.
 Interior: live photograph by Stuart Kelly; spikes photograph by Richard Dumas.
 Booklet: additional photography by Richard Mulhearn, Josh Raikes, Rick Myers, Matthew Norman, Natalie Curtis, Ewan Spencer, Mark Thomas, Jon Shard, and Mark Elkins.
 Live poster design: December by Rick Myers; Train by Matthew Norman; The Social by Twelve Ten; Sweden by Henke Walse; U.S. Tour by Michael Jobson; Christmas Tree by Bill Green; Dandelion by Factor27.

References

External links
 Doves' official website
 Doves Music Blog

Doves (band) albums
Doves (band) video albums
2010 greatest hits albums
2010 video albums
Music video compilation albums
B-side compilation albums
Heavenly Recordings compilation albums
Heavenly Recordings video albums
Albums produced by Dan Austin